Marc-Alain Ouaknin (born 5 March 1957) both a rabbi and a philosopher. He is the son of Rabbi Jacques Ouaknin (b. 1932, Marrakesh, Morocco) and Eliane Erlich Ouaknin (b. 1932, Lille; d. 2007, Marseille.) His father is the Grand Rabbi of the French cities of Reims, Lille, Metz, and Marseille. Ouaknin dedicated his best-known work, The Burnt Book, to "my father, my master, Grand Rabbi Jacques Ouaknin."

Biography

Ouaknin holds a doctorate in philosophy and is the Director of the Centre De Recherches Et D’études Juives in Paris. He is also a professor of comparative literature at Bar-Ilan University in Israel. A major focus of his work since the 1980s has been to comment upon and extend the philosophy of Emmanuel Lévinas by comparing Levinas's writings to other Jewish texts—in particular to those of Hasidism and the Kabbalah. His work is in the continental philosophical tradition and emphasizes concepts current in French intellectual life. Unlike traditional rabbinic discourse, Ouaknin regularly cites thinkers outside the Jewish tradition, such as the psychoanalyst Jacques Lacan and the phenomenologist Maurice Merleau-Ponty.

Literary works

Ouaknin's books and articles have been translated into more than twenty languages. His best-known book in the English-speaking world is The Burnt Book (Le livre brûlé).

Partial bibliography

 The Burnt Book: Reading the Talmud, translation by Llewellyn Brown of Le livre brûlé, Lire le Talmud, Princeton University Press (1995)
 Le livre brûlé, Lire le Talmud, Lieu Commun (1986); Seuil (1992)
 La bible de l'humour juif, with D. Rotnemer, Ramsay (1995); J'ai lu (2002)
 ''Jean Daviot, Le ciel au bout des doigts, Paris Musées /Actes Sud, (2004)

References

1957 births
Living people
French Jews
French Orthodox rabbis
21st-century French philosophers
Jewish philosophers
Philosophers of Judaism
French male non-fiction writers
20th-century French rabbis
21st-century French rabbis
Rabbis from Paris
Paris Nanterre University alumni
Academic staff of Bar-Ilan University